The Lord of Bute was a title for the lord of Bute, Scotland in High Medieval Scotland.

Lords of Bute

Alan fitz Walter 1200–1204
John Stewart of Bute ?–1449

References
Paul, James Balfour; The Scots Peerage, (Edinburgh, 1909)

Isle of Bute